The Truro News is a weekly newspaper in Truro, Nova Scotia, Canada, covering Colchester County.

The paper is currently owned by SaltWire Network, and is sisters with The News in New Glasgow, Nova Scotia and the Cape Breton Post.

See also
List of newspapers in Canada

References

External links
 

SaltWire Network publications
Truro, Nova Scotia
Daily newspapers published in Nova Scotia
Publications established in 1891
1891 establishments in Nova Scotia